National Institute of Immunology (NII) is an autonomous research institute located in New Delhi,  under the Department of Biotechnology (DBT) for research in immunology.

NII was established on 24 June 1981, with Prof. M. G. K. Menon as Chairman of its governing body. It has its origins in the ICMR–WHO Research & Training Centre in Immunology at the All India Institute of Medical Sciences (AIIMS), Delhi, which was  merged with NII  in 1982. However, NII continued to function from AIIMS laboratory of its honorary Director Prof G.P. Talwar, till its new building was constructed in 1983, carved out of the Jawaharlal Nehru University (JNU) campus. G.P. Talwar is the founder director of this institute. A first of its kind vaccine for leprosyin India have been developed by NII and it was named as mycobacterium indicus prani.

References

External links
 Official website

Research institutes in Delhi
Immunology organizations
Organizations established in 1981
Medical research institutes in India